WFC Beroe Stara Zagora is a Bulgarian women's football club from Stara Zagora representing PFC Beroe Stara Zagora in the women's Bulgarian Championship. The team finished fourth in 2010 and 2011 and reached the 2010 national cup's final.

2022-23 squad
According to the club's website

References

Women's football clubs in Bulgaria
Beroe Stara Zagora